Divian Ladwa is an English  actor best known for appearing in the Oscar-nominated Lion, the BAFTA-winning comedy series Detectorists, and the Marvel Studios film Ant-Man and the Wasp.

Career

TV and film 
Divian Ladwa's film debut came in a micro-budget feature Saxon, in which he played a hot-headed Rahim Begum alongside Sean Harris. The film won Best European Drama at the ECU European Independent Film Festival and was nominated for the Michael Powell Award for Best Film at the Edinburgh International Film Festival.

His next role was shy and awkward Dev King in the British feature film 8 Minutes Idle. The twisted rom-com was nominated for Best Film at the Royal Television Society Awards  and features Tom Hughes, Ophelia Lovibond, Antonia Thomas, Montserrat Lombard and Jack Ashton.

Ladwa is known for playing the sweet and innocent Hugh in the BAFTA-winning comedy series Detectorists written and directed by Mackenzie Crook. Originally aired on BBC Four, the show won critical praise and won two BAFTAs.

In 2017, Ladwa received attention for playing a psychologically traumatised character in the Oscar-nominated Lion. The film starred Nicole Kidman and David Wenham as his adoptive parents and Dev Patel as his adoptive brother. The double BAFTA-winning film, which also starred Rooney Mara, was nominated for four Golden Globes and six Academy Awards including Best Picture. Critics praised Ladwa's performance, with Cinapse writing "Lion is aided greatly by the likes of Divian Ladwa who is positively heartbreaking,"
. Stuff wrote "Ladwa is excellent as the wayward brother." 
 and
Entertainment.ie said
"Ladwa gives a fascinating portrayal of the adopted brother."
Along with Dev Patel and David Wenham, Ladwa was included in the film's submission to the Screen Actors Guild Awards for their Best Supporting Actor category.

In 2018, he appeared in Ant-Man and the Wasp as Uzman, the right-hand man of antagonist Sonny Burch.

Later that year ITV announced Ladwa's involvement as a series regular in their upcoming police drama Wild Bill, playing opposite Rob Lowe, Rachel Stirling, Angela Griffin and Bronwyn James.

In 2019, Ladwa appeared in the British dark comedy series The End of the F***ing World as Sid, a talkative cop. He made a special guest appearance in episode 7 of the second series. The series premiered on Channel 4 in the UK and internationally the following day on Netflix. Netflix submitted Ladwa for consideration for the Primetime Emmy Awards as Outstanding Guest Actor in a Comedy Series category for his portrayal of Sid.
 

2019 saw the online release of period drama Mr Malcolm's List on the Refinery29 website, with Ladwa playing Gemma Chan and Frieda Pinto's footman John in a highly comical role. The film is part of Refinery29's Shatterbox series aiding and encouraging more female filmmakers. Following the success of the short, Mr Malcolm's List was made into a feature with Ladwa reprising his role as John. The film was released in 2022 to positive reviews and received a nomination for Best Independent Motion Picture by the NAACP Image Awards. The Hollywood Reporter, Associated Press   highlighted Ladwa's "amusing" performance with one review stating "Divian Ladwa from Lion steals any scene he's in".

In 2020, Ladwa played Dr Chillip in Armando Iannucci's adaptation of Charles Dickens The Personal History of David Copperfield, which also stars Hugh Laurie and Tilda Swinton and reunites Ladwa onscreen with Dev Patel.

Stage
Away from TV and Film, Ladwa has an extensive theatre background, working with a wide range of companies including Theatre Royal Stratford East, Tamasha Theatre Company and Fluxx Improvised Theatre, early in his career.

Radio
Ladwa has worked in numerous radio plays, mostly for BBC Radio 4, many of which have been recognised by various accolades. Six-part BBC drama The System, in wbich Ladwa plays Coyote, won the PRIX EUROPA for Best Fiction Series..Audible's Radioman, a ten-part audio drama series in which Ladwa appears as Manny, received a Rose D'or Award nomination for best drama. Ladwa has also played secondary-school student Charlie in School Drama and Romeo in Romeo and Juliet opposite Tom Hollander. He also played Vince the Mushroom Man in a continuation of Neil Gaiman's Neverwhere series, How The Marquis Got His Coat Back.

Filmography

References

Sources

External links 
 Divian Ladwa website
 

Living people
English people of Indian descent
English male film actors
English male television actors
21st-century English male actors
Year of birth missing (living people)